Gheorghe Argeșanu (28 February 1883 – 26/27 November 1940) was a Romanian cavalry general and politician who served as a Prime Minister of Romania for about a week in September 1939.

Biography
Born in Caracal, he was promoted to a leadership position in the Romanian Army during World War I, and served as the first Romanian military attaché to Japan (1921–1922) and as Minister of Defense in the second Miron Cristea cabinet (March–October 1938).

Argeșanu was appointed as premier by King Carol II after the assassination of his predecessor Armand Călinescu by the nationalist Iron Guard, and promoted to the rank of Lieutenant General. His first noted measures included the public display of the bodies of Călinescu's assassins (who had been killed by orders from Horia Sima) and the arbitrary arrest and execution without trial of at least three Iron Guard members in each county. He was replaced as premier by Constantin Argetoianu.

Immediately after the establishment of the Iron Guard's National Legionary State, Argeșanu himself was imprisoned without trial in the Jilava prison, and ultimately killed there during the Jilava Massacre by members of the Iron Guard on the same night together with 63 other political prisoners, in retaliation for the violence he had endorsed.

Argeșanu was married to the pianist Manya Botez.

Gallery

References

1883 births
1940 deaths
People from Caracal, Romania
Prime Ministers of Romania
Romanian Ministers of Defence
National Renaissance Front politicians
Romanian Land Forces generals
Romanian military attachés
Romanian military personnel of World War I
Romanian people of World War II
World War II political leaders
Romanian people who died in prison custody
Prisoners who died in Romanian detention
People assassinated by the Romanian Iron Guard
Prisoners murdered in custody
People murdered in Romania
Burials at Ghencea Cemetery
Heads of government who were later imprisoned